Jermaine is a masculine given name.

It can also refer to:
 Jermaine (1972 album), an album by Jermaine Jackson
 Jermaine (1980 album), an album by the aforementioned artist
 "Jermaine" (Adventure Time), an episode of an animated series